Kameshnitsa is a rural locality (a village) in Ramenskoye Rural Settlement, Sheksninsky District, Vologda Oblast, Russia. The population was 8 as of 2002.

Geography 
Kameshnitsa is located 46 km north of Sheksna (the district's administrative centre) by road. Novo is the nearest rural locality.

References 

Rural localities in Sheksninsky District